Gustavo Pérez Firmat was born in 1949, Havana, Cuba, and raised in Miami, Florida. He attended Miami-Dade Community College, the University of Miami,  and the University of Michigan, where he earned a Ph.D. in Comparative Literature. He taught at Duke University from 1979 to 1999 and is the David Feinson Professor Emeritus of Humanities at Columbia University. He serves on the editorial advisory board of Chiricú.

Honors 
Pérez Firmat is a member of the American Academy of Arts and Sciences and has been the recipient of fellowships from the John Simon Guggenheim Foundation, the National Endowment for the Humanities, the American Council of Learned Societies, and the Mellon Foundation. In 1995, Pérez Firmat was named Duke University Scholar/Teacher of the Year. In 1997 Newsweek included him among “100 Americans to watch for the 21st century” and Hispanic Business Magazine selected him as one of the “100 most influential Hispanics” in the United States. In 2004 he was named one of New York’s thirty “outstanding Latinos” by El Diario La Prensa. He was featured in the documentary CubAmerican and in the 2013 PBS series Latino Americans.

See also 

 Latino literature

Works
Pérez Firmat is the author of  books and essays on Latinx literature, philosophy, and culture. His books of literary and cultural criticism include:

 Idle Fictions (Duke, 1982; rev. ed. 1993)
 Literature and Liminality (Duke, 1986)
 The Cuban Condition (Cambridge, 1989; rpt. 2005)
 Do the Americas Have a Common Literature? (Duke, 1990)
 Life on the Hyphen (Texas, 1994, Rpt. 1996, 1999; revised and expanded edition 2012); Spanish version: Vidas en vilo, Colibrí, 2000; rev. ed. Hypermedia, 2015)
 My Own Private Cuba (Colorado, 1999)
 Cincuenta lecciones de exilio y desexilio (Universal, 2000; rev. ed. Hypermedia, 2016)
 Tongue Ties (Palgrave, 2003) 
 The Havana Habit (Yale, 2010) 
 The Norton Anthology of Latino Literature [Co-editor] (Norton, 2010)
 A Cuban in Mayberry: Looking Back at America's Hometown (Texas, 2014)
 Sin lengua, deslenguado (Ediciones Cátedra, 2017)
Poesía romántica inglesa by Heberto Padilla [Editor] (Linden Lane Press, 2018)
He has also published several collections of poetry in English and Spanish: Carolina Cuban (Bilingual Press, 1987), Equivocaciones (Betania, 1989), Bilingual Blues (Bilingual Press, 1995); Scar Tissue (Bilingual Press, 2005); The Last Exile (Finishing Line Press, 2016); Viejo verde (Main Street Rag, 2019); a novel, Anything But Love (Arte Público, 2000); and a memoir, Next Year in Cuba: A Cubano's Coming-of-Age in America (Doubleday 1995; rev. ed. 2000; rpt. Arte Público, 2005; Spanish version: El año que viene estamos en Cuba, Arte Público, 1997). Pérez Firmat’s poems have appeared in many magazines, journals and anthologies.

Next Year in Cuba was nominated for a Pulitzer Prize in non-fiction in 1995. Life on the Hyphen was awarded the Eugene M. Kayden Award for 1994 and received Honorable Mention in the Modern Language Association’s Katherine Singer Kovács Prize and the Latin American Studies Association’s Bryce Wood Book Award.

References 

 www.gustavoperezfirmat.com
 Alonso Gallo, Laura. "Un largo archipiélago de otras incubaciones: La condición cubana del exilio en la obra de Gustavo Pérez Firmat." Revista Hispano Cubana 13 (2002).
 Álvarez Borland, Isabel. Cuban-American Literature of Exile: From Person to Persona. Charlottesville: University Press of Virginia, 1998.
 Dalleo, Raphael, and Elena Machado Sáez. The Latino/a Canon and the Emergence of Post-Sixties Literature. New York: Palgrave Macmillan, 2007. pp. 133–158. 
 Figueredo, D.H. "Pérez Firmat, Gustavo (1949-)." The Encyclopedia of Caribbean Literature.  Vol. 2: M-Z. Edited by Danilo Figueredo. Westport, CT: Greenwood Press, 2006: 624-625. 
 López, Iraida H., "The Notion of Volver in Cuban-American Memoirs: Gustavo Pérez Firmat's Next Year in Cuba as a Case of Mistaken Coordinates." South Atlantic Review 77.3-4 (2012): 59-76.
 Lowe, John Wharton. "Southern Ajiaco: Miami and the Generation of Cuban American Writing." in Calypso Magnolia: The Crosscurrents of Caribbean and Southern Literature. Chapel Hill: University of North Carolina Press, 2016. 243-338.
 Luis, William, "Exiled Hyphenated Identities in Gustavo Pérez Firmat's Next Year in Cuba." Cuban-American Literature and Art: Negotiating Identities. Edited by Isabel Álvarez Borland and Lynette M. Bosch. Albany: State University of New York Press, 2009. 93-107.
Rolando Pérez (Cuban poet). “Bilingual Blues.” (Gustavo Pérez-Firmat). Encyclopedia of Hispanic-American Literature. Edited by Luz Elena Ramírez. NY: Facts on File 2008: 37-38.
 Torres, Rodolfo D., and Francisco H. Vázquez. Latino/a Thought: Culture, Politics, and Society. Lanham: Rowman & Littlefield, 2003.

Interviews
 A Poet's Truth: Conversations With Latino/Latina Poets. Interview by Bruce Allen Dick. Tucson: University of Arizona Press, 2003.
 "Gustavo Pérez Firmat, poeta deslenguado." Interview by José Antonio Martínez. "Los personas del verbo." Onda regional de Murcia, November 25, 2017. 
 "Gustavo Pérez Firmat, con la lengua afuera." Interview by Yannelys Aparicio. Revista Letral 19 (2017): 139-145.
 "Un barrio de La Habana llamado Miami, un suburbio de Miami llamado La Habana." Interview by Jorge Enrique Lage. Hypermedia Magazine. April 20, 2016. https://hypermediamagazine.com/2016/04/19/jorge-enrique-lage-un-barrio-de-la-habana-llamado-miami-un-suburbio-de-miami-llamado-la-habana
"Living in Parts, Dreaming of Wholeness." Interview by Aneta Pavlenko. Psychology Today. March 22, 2016. https://www.psychologytoday.com/blog/life-bilingual/201603/living-in-parts-dreaming-wholeness
 "¿Existe una literatura cubanoamericana?"Interview by José Prats Sariol. Diario de Cuba, January 18, 2014. http://www.diariodecuba.com/cultura/1389988797_6740.html
 "For a Bilingual Writer No One True Language." National Public Radio Morning Edition. October 17, 2011.  http://npr.org/2011/10/17/141368408/for-a-bilingual-writer-no-one-true-language
 “El Derecho a la Equivocación: Conversación con Gustavo Pérez Firmat." Interview by Rolando Pérez (Cuban poet). Boletín de la Academia Norteamericana de la Lengua Española. No. 14. 2011: 351-363. https://www.academia.edu/4895461/_El_Derecho_a_la_Equivocaci%C3%B3n_Conversaci%C3%B3n_con_Gustavo_P%C3%A9rez_Firmat_

Columbia University faculty
Duke University faculty
Latin Americanists
Living people
Miami Dade College alumni
20th-century Cuban poets
Cuban male poets
Cuban male novelists
American male novelists
Cuban essayists
American male essayists
Horace H. Rackham School of Graduate Studies alumni
21st-century Cuban poets
21st-century male writers
Year of birth missing (living people)
University of Miami alumni
20th-century Cuban novelists
21st-century Cuban novelists